The Joppa and Eastern Railroad  is an American railway company that is subsidiary of Ameren, that is mainly used for delivering Powder River Coal to a power plant on the Ohio River, just west of Joppa, Illinois. They own numerous hopper cars with the JE reporting mark, and use Union Pacific motive power.

References

 

Massac County, Illinois
Illinois railroads
Non-operating common carrier freight railroads in the United States